Jackie Davis (December 13, 1920 – November 2, 1999) was an American soul jazz singer, organist and bandleader. He is notable for his contributions in bringing the Hammond organ to the forefront of jazz and pop, preceding the better-known Jimmy Smith by several years.

Life and career
Davis was born and grew up in Jacksonville, Florida, and started playing piano at the age of ten, before studying music at Florida A&M. He experimented with jazz on the pipe organ, before switching to the Hammond. He was influenced by Wild Bill Davis and Bill Doggett, and after a spell backing Louis Jordan, he started fronting his own jazz groups.

His solo career began in earnest after a residency at the Club Harlem in Philadelphia in 1951, and from there he began touring across the US, with the Hammond now being his trademark. He notably preceded Jimmy Smith in using the instrument in small jazz combos. Regular touring led to a recording contract with Capitol, with whom he recorded several albums. His initial sessions were on a Model B, but by the time he recorded Hi-Fi Hammond Vol.2, he had upgraded to the classic B-3.

In the 1960s, he signed to Warner Bros. Records, releasing Easy Does It as The Jackie Davis Quartet, following it up with Jackie Davis Plus Voices, which also featured the Sid Bass Chorus on backing vocals. For this album, Davis put more of an emphasis on his vocal skills, using the Hammond sparingly.

He made a brief comeback in 1980, recording a self-titled album for EMI, and making a cameo appearance in the film Caddyshack as the country club valet Porterhouse. He kept Jacksonville as his homebase and died on November 2, 1999 following a stroke.

Legacy
While Davis is remembered mostly as a jazz organist, he was capable of a wide variety of styles, though he himself preferred to focus on jazz. In 1963, in an interview for the Hammond Times, he thought "the term 'jazz' is vastly overworked and misused ... Basically, jazz is a style of making music." He felt that the Hammond gave him the versatility he needed to emulate the sound of a big band in a small group. Author and Hammond enthusiast Scott Faragher feels that Davis' recorded output has been overlooked because it sounds dated, but stresses his importance in giving the Hammond recognition in the jazz and pop world should not be underestimated.

Shirley Scott stated her playing was influenced by Davis, claiming he knew "everything about the Hammond organ" and was impressed with his ability to manipulate the instrument.

Discography

Studio albums

Compilations

As sideman

References

1920 births
1999 deaths
Musicians from Jacksonville, Florida
American jazz organists
American male organists
American jazz singers
Singers from Florida
20th-century American singers
20th-century organists
20th-century American male musicians
American male jazz musicians
20th-century American keyboardists
Capitol Records artists
Warner Records artists
EMI Records artists